The McKenzie method (full name: McKenzie method of mechanical diagnosis and therapy (MDT)) is a technique primarily used in physical therapy. It was developed in the late 1950s by New Zealand physiotherapist Robin McKenzie (1931–2013). In 1981 he launched the concept which he called Mechanical Diagnosis and Therapy (MDT) – a system encompassing assessment, diagnosis and treatment for the spine and extremities. MDT categorises patients' complaints not on an anatomical basis, but subgroups them by the clinical presentation of patients.

McKenzie exercises involve spinal extension exercises, as opposed to William flexion exercises, which involve lumbar flexion exercises.

Effectiveness 
There is only weak evidence for the effectiveness of the method's use for treating lower back pain, and research into the effectiveness of the McKenzie method has been of poor quality.

Compared to other treatments, the McKenzie method is not better at treating acute pain and disability for people with lower back pain. It may be better than some other approaches for chronic lower back pain, but this evidence for this is insufficient to recommend the method.

Exercises targeting midline strengthening, as used in the McKenzie method, are no more helpful for lower back pain than conventional flexion and extension exercises.

History 
The McKenzie method has its roots in an event in 1956 that led to increased experimentation of certain movement in order to elicit what McKenzie method practitioners call the centralisation phenomenon—pain moving towards the spine. A patient who was experiencing pain lay down on McKenzie's treatment table. After bending backward for five minutes, the patient experienced noted improvement. This led McKenzie to experiment with specific movement patterns to treat chronic lower back pain and bring about centralisation of pain symptoms. McKenzie later developed a classification system to categorise spinal pain problems, and published books on the topic, including Treat Your Own Back (1980).

The McKenzie method was commonly used worldwide in the late 2000s in diagnosis and treatment of low back pain, and peripheral joint complaints. The International MDT Research Foundation, based in the United States, funds research to demonstrate the effectiveness and scope of action of the McKenzie method.

Centralisation 
Centralisation occurs when pain symptoms off-centered from the mid-line of the spine migrate towards the centre of the mid-line of the spine. This migration of pain symptoms to the centre of the lower back is a sign of progress in the McKenzie method. Extension exercises are sometimes referred to as McKenzie exercises for this reason. According to the McKenzie method, movements and exercises that produce centralisation are beneficial, whereas movements that move pain away from the spinal mid-line are detrimental.

See also
 Williams Flexion Exercises

References

External links
 McKenzie Institute International

Rehabilitation medicine
Physical therapy
Sports medicine
Manual therapy
Health care in New Zealand
Fringe theories